The following list is based on locations listed in Phipps (1840). The locations are listed in order as one goes down the Hooghly River towards the river's mouth. The name in the first column of the table is the name one encounters most frequently in British East India Company (EIC) sources. East and West in the table refer to the banks of the river.

After the construction of the Strand Road, in the 1820s, shipbuilding was concentrated at Sulkea, Howrah, and Kidderpore. The greatest shipbuilding years on the Hooghly up to 1839 were 1813 (21 vessels and 10,376 tons (bm)), 1801 (19 vessels and 10,079 tons (bm)), and 1816 (18 vessels and 8,198 tons (bm)). (This data does not include vessels built for the Bengal Pilot Service.)

Citations and references
Citations

References
Nautical Magazine and Naval Chronicle... a Journal of Papers on Subjects Connected with Maritime Affairs (1855). (Simpkin, Marshall & Company).
Phipps, John, (of the Master Attendant's Office, Calcutta), (1840) A Collection of Papers Relative to Ship Building in India ...: Also a Register Comprehending All the Ships ... Built in India to the Present Time .... (Scott).

Age of Sail merchant ships of England
British ships built in India
Maritime history of India
Shipyards of India